is a Japanese politician of the Democratic Party of Japan, a member of the House of Councillors in the Diet (national legislature). A native of Ikeda, Osaka and graduate of Kobe University, he was elected for the first time in 1992.
Before becoming a politician, he worked for Toyota and its union for a long time.

References

External links 
  in Japanese.

Living people
1945 births
Democratic Party of Japan politicians
Japanese trade unionists
Members of the House of Councillors (Japan)
People from Ikeda, Osaka
Toyota people
Kobe University alumni
Government ministers of Japan